2 Bugs and a Roach is an album by blues musician Earl Hooker released by the Arhoolie label in 1969. Jimmy Page wanted a Gibson EDS-1275 guitar, after seeing the sleeve.

Reception

The AllMusic review stated: "Earl Hooker's Two Bugs and a Roach is a varied lot, with vocals from Hooker, Andrew Odom, and Carey Bell in between the instrumentals, all cut in 1968. All in all, it's one of the must-haves in this artist's very small discography -- a nice representative sample from Chicago's unsung master of the electric guitar".

Track listing
All compositions credited to Earl Hooker except where noted
 "Anna Lee" (McCoy, Hooker) – 6:30
 "Off the Hook" – 3:54
 "Love Ain't a Plaything" (Carey Bell) – 4:58
 "You Don't Want Me" – 5:16
 "Two Bugs and a Roach" – 4:19
 "Wah Wah Blues" – 4:36
 "You Don't Love Me" (Andrew Odom) – 5:37
 "Earl Hooker Blues" – 5:14

Personnel
Earl Hooker – guitar, vocals
Joe Willie Perkins – piano, organ
Fred Roulette – steel guitar
Geno Skaggs – bass guitar 
Levi Warren (tracks 2, 4, 7 & 8), Fred Williams (tracks 1, 3, 5 & 6) – drums
Louis Myers – harmonica (track 1)
Carey Bell – lead vocals, harmonica (track 3)
Andrew "B.B. Jr." Odom – lead vocals (track 7), backing vocals (track 5)

References

Earl Hooker albums
1969 albums
Arhoolie Records albums